Viktor Chernomyrdin's Second Cabinet acted under President Boris Yeltsin from August 10, 1996 until March 23, 1998. The State Duma overwhelmingly confirmed reappointment of Chernomyrdin as head of the Cabinet, with 314 deputies voting in favor, far more than the simple majority of 216 needed for approval and 85 deputies were opposed.

Composition

References

Chernomyrdin
1996 establishments in Russia
1998 disestablishments in Russia
Cabinets established in 1996
Cabinets disestablished in 1998